Viburnum subpubescens is a species of plant in the Adoxaceae family. It is endemic to Honduras.

References

subpubescens
Endemic flora of Honduras
Critically endangered flora of North America
Taxonomy articles created by Polbot